Cornard United Football Club is a football club based in Great Cornard, near Sudbury, Suffolk, England.

History
The club was established in 1964, and initially played in the Sudbury Sunday League, before joining Division Three of the Bury and District League in 1966. They were promoted to Division Two at the end of their first season, and were promoted again the next. In 1970 they transferred to Division Six of the Colchester & East Essex League. In 1971–72 they won the division, and were promoted to Division Five. The following season they won all 26 matches and were promoted again. The next two seasons also saw the club promoted as champions, reaching Division Two in 1975.

In 1976 the club switched leagues again, this time to Division One of the Essex and Suffolk Border League. Although they were placed in Division Two after restructuring in 1978, they were promoted to Division One in 1982–83 after finishing as Division Two runners-up. In 1985–86 they were promoted to the Premier Division, and in the 1988–89 season they won the league, the league cup (beating Tiptree United Reserves on penalties after a 1–1 draw in the final) and the Suffolk Senior Cup with a 1–0 win against Sudbury Wanderers in the final. At the end of the season they were promoted to Division One of the Eastern Counties League.

They won the division at the first attempt, and were promoted to the Premier Division, where they remained until 1996, when they finished bottom and were relegated. In 2001 the club attempted to change their name to Sudbury Borough, but it was rejected by the parish council. They reached the final of the Suffolk Senior Cup in 2018–19, losing 4–3 to Achilles. At the end of the 2020–21 season the club were transferred to Division One South.

Ground
The club initially played at the Great Cornard Recreation Ground, before moving to Great Cornard Upper School in 1975. In 1982 they moved to their current ground on Blackhouse Lane, although they continued to use the changing facilities at the school until the start of the 1983–84 season. When the club joined the ECL in 1990 the pitch was moved to the top end of Blackhouse Lane.

Honours
Eastern Counties League
Division One Champions 1989–90
Essex & Suffolk Border League
Premier Division champions 1988–89
League Cup Winners 1988–89
Colchester & East Essex League
Division Three champions 1974–75
Division Four champions 1973–74
Division Five champions 1972–73
Division Six champions 1971–72
Eastern Floodlight Cup
Winners 2002
Suffolk Senior Cup
Winners 1988–89

Records
Best FA Cup performance: First qualifying round, 1993–94, 1994–95, 2004–05, 2008–09
Best FA Vase performance: Second round, 2008–09
Record attendance: 400 vs West Ham United, friendly match, 2001–02
Most appearances: Keith Featherstone
Most goals: Andy Smiles

See also
Cornard United F.C. players

References

External links
Official website

Football clubs in England
Football clubs in Suffolk
Association football clubs established in 1964
1964 establishments in England
Sudbury, Suffolk
St. Edmundsbury Football League
Colchester and East Essex Football League
Essex and Suffolk Border Football League
Eastern Counties Football League